The Canadian Derby is a Canadian Thoroughbred horse race run annually at the Century Mile Racetrack and Casino in Leduc County, Alberta. A Grade III event held in August, it is open to three-year-old horses and is raced on dirt over a distance of one mile and a quarter (10 furlongs).

The race was the creation of future Canadian Horse Racing Hall of Fame inductee R. James Speers and first run in 1930 at his Polo Park Racetrack in Winnipeg, Manitoba. Inaugurated as the Manitoba Stakes, it was restricted to Manitoba-bred horses until 1936 when the race was renamed the Manitoba Derby and made open to three-year-old horses bred in Canada. In 1941, the name was changed again to its present form as the Canadian Derby. In 1942, future Canadian and U.S. Racing Hall of Fame jockey Johnny Longden won this race.

As the Canadian Derby grew in prestige and its purse money increased, top horses from Toronto and Montreal began coming west to compete in the race. In 1937 Goldlure won Canada's most prestigious race, the King's Plate. For owner Harry Hatch, trainer Bill Bringloe would later ship the colt 1,300 miles by rail transport from Toronto and win the Derby. Budpath, another King's Plate winner, won the 1941 edition of the Canadian Derby. However, not all eastern-based horses have fared so well. In 1942, Ten To Ace was shipped in from Toronto by leading owner/trainer Harry Giddings Jr. The colt had won the King's Plate as well as the Prince of Wales Stakes and according to Time magazine was being called  "the greatest Canadian horse of all time." Not only was Ten To Ace defeated in the Canadian Derby, he finished dead last.

In 1956, Polo Park Racetrack was closed and the race was moved to Northlands Park in Edmonton, Alberta. In 2019, the race moved to its present location at the Century Mile Racetrack and Casino south of Edmonton.

The Canadian Derby was contested at 1 mile from 1930 to 1933,  miles from 1934 to 1956, and  miles from 1957 until 2018. The race returned to  miles in 2019 when it was moved to Century Mile Racetrack.

In 2017, Chief Know It All finished first but the jockey of runner-up Double Bear filed a claim of interference. When the claim was rejected by track stewards the matter was appealed to the Alberta Horse Racing Appeal Tribunal which in July 2018 ruled in favour of the owner of Double Bear. An appeal of the Tribunal's order resulted in an August 2018 Court of Queen's Bench of Alberta ruling that Chief Know It All had interfered and declared Double Bear the winner.

Records
Most wins by a jockey:
 6 - Rico Walcott (2010, 2013, 2014, 2017, 2018, 2022)

Most wins by an owner:
 3 - Harry C. Hatch (1936, 1937, 1941)

Winners of the Canadian Derby since 1996

Earlier winners

1995 - Sovacianto
1994 - Funboy
1993 - Cozzy Grey
1992 - Josh's Hero
1991 - Sounds Fabulous
1990 - Hurricane Benny
1989 - Haveigotadealforu
1988 - Elmtex
1987 - Steady Power
1986 - Slyly Gifted
1985 - Polynesian Flyer
1984 - Let's Go Blue
1983 - Victorious Lad
1982 - Exclusive Canadian
1981 - Frost King
1980 - Driving Home
1979 - All For Victory
1978 - Canadian Bill
1977 - Western Reason
1976 - Laissez Passer
1975 - Pampas Host
1974 - Progressive Hope
1973 - Wing Span
1972 - Winning Red
1971 - Kim's Kid
1970 - Swinging Apache
1969 - Wyn D'Amour
1968 - Son Costume
1967 - Gilmore
1966 - Klondike Prince
1965 - Chariot Chaser
1964 - Quick Quick
1963 - Brother Leo
1962 - Western Morn
1961 - Galindo
1961 - General C
1960 - Count Lathum
1959 - Sonoma
1958 - Percy Yates
1957 - Spangled Jimmy
1956 - Argent
1955 - Loyalist
1954 - Treheme
1953 - Chain Reaction
1952 - Lord Strome
1951 - Beau Orage
1950 - Sir Strome
1949 - Yates Senior
1948 - Victory Gift
1947 - Sir Berrill
1946 - Palermo
1945 - Ferry Pilot
1944 - Gower Mon
1943 - Western Prince
1942 - Maginot Line
1941 - Budpath
1940 - Sir Trapseth
1939 - Larry Eckardt
1938 - Gowerlace
1937 - Goldlure
1936 - Sweepden
1935 - Nellie Quince
1934 - Caramar
1933 - Carhan Queen
1932 - Lady Marnock
1931 - Parisienne
1930 - Jack Whittier

See also
 List of Canadian flat horse races

Notes

References
 Wilson, Keith & Lussier, Antoine S. Off And Running - Horse Racing in Manitoba (1978) Peguis Publishers Limited 
 The Canadian Derby at Pedigree Query

Graded stakes races in Canada
Horse races in Canada
Flat horse races for three-year-olds
Leduc County
Recurring events established in 1930
1930 establishments in Manitoba
Summer events in Canada